The 1938-39 French Rugby Union Championship of first division was won by Biarritz that beat the Perpignan in the final. Biarritz olympique took his revenge of the previous year when was defeated by Perpignan in the final.

The tournament was played by 42 clubs divided in six pool of seven. The better eight were qualified for the quarters of finals

Context 
The 1938 International Championship was won by Wales, the France was excluded

Semifinals

Final

External links
 Compte rendu de la finale de 1939, sur lnr.fr

1939
France 1939
Championship